V. T. Rajshekar, in full Vontibettu Thimmappa Rajshekar Shetty, (born 1932) is an Indian journalist who is the founder and editor of the Dalit Voice, which has been described by Human Rights Watch as "India’s most widely circulated Dalit journal".

He was formerly a journalist on the Indian Express, where he worked for 25 years. He is the founder of the 'Dalit Voice' organisation a radical wing of the broader movement for Dalit interests.

Positions and Dalit Voice

Started in 1981, Dalit Voice is a periodical launched by Rajshekhar. Under Rajshekhar's the Dalit Voice organisation formulated an Indian variant of afrocentrism similar to that of the Nation of Islam in the USA but it is different from other magazines in many aspects. It is notable for promoting radical antisemitism borrowed from Western sources and also its link to Afrocentrist ideologies. The book declares the Indian castes as nations within the nation of India. It argues for the strengthening of each caste.

Controversy and criticism
Dalit Voice harshly criticizes Israel and Zionism, which at times crosses the line into antisemitism. It has published articles about 'Zionist conspiracies' regarding Hitler and the Third Reich. They have also supported the Iranian government and Mahmoud Ahmadinejad's denial of the Holocaust.

Passport confiscation
In 1986 Rajshekar’s passport was confiscated because of "anti-Hinduism writings outside of India". The same year, he was arrested in Bangalore under India’s Terrorism and Anti-Disruptive Activities Act. Rajshekar told Human Rights Watch that this arrest was for an editorial he had written in Dalit Voice, that another writer who republished the editorial was also arrested, and that he was eventually released with an apology. Rajshekar has also been arrested under the Sedition Act and under the Indian Penal Code for creating disaffection between communities.

Books and pamphlets
  Dalit Movement in Karnataka
 How Marx Died In Hindu India
 Why Godse Killed Gandhi
 Hindu Serpent And Muslim Mongoose
 Dialogue Of The Bhoodevatas
 Bhoodevtavon Ki Batchit in Urdu
 Mahatma Gandhi and Babasaheb Ambedkar: Clash of Two Values: The Verdict of History. Bangalore: Dalit Sahitya Akademy, 1989
 Dalit: The Black Untouchables of India (foreword by Y.N. Kly). Atlanta; Ottawa: Clarity Press, c1987 (Originally published under title: Apartheid in India. Bangalore: Dalit Action Committee, 1979)
 Apartheid in India: An International Problem, 2nd rev. ed. Publisher: Bangalore: Dalit Sahitya Akademy, 1983
 Ambedkar and His Conversion: a critique. Bangalore: Dalit Action Committee, Karnataka, 1980
 Judicial Terrorism
 India As A Failed State
 Aggression On Indian Culture
 Development Redefined
 Caste – A Nation within the Nation
 India's Intellectual Desert
 The Zionist Arthashastra (Protocols of the Learned Elders of Zion)
 Brahminism In India And Zionism In West
 India's Muslim Problem
 India On The Path To Islamisation
 Dalit Voice – A New Experiment in Journalism
 Brahminism
 Weopons To Fight Counter Revolution
 Riddles in Hinduism by Babasaheb Ambedkar
 Know The Hindu Mind

Awards
 In 2005 Rajshekar received the London Institute of South Asia (LISA) Book of the Year Award.
In 2018 Rajshekar received the Mukundan C Menon Award instituted by the National Confederation of Human Rights Organization’s (NCHRO).

References

1932 births
Ethnocentrism
Indian newspaper journalists
Living people
Pseudohistorians
Dalit writers
People from Dakshina Kannada district
Journalists from Karnataka
Indian political journalists
20th-century Indian journalists